Khaosai Galaxy (born, 15 May 1959) is a Thai former professional boxer who competed between 1980 and 1991. He was also a Muay Thai practitioner. He held the WBA super-flyweight title between November 1984 and December 1991. He is listed #19 on Ring Magazine's list of 100 greatest punchers of all time and named him the 43rd greatest fighter of the past 80 years in 2002. As of 2022, BoxRec rates him as the best Thai boxer of all time, pound for pound.

Muay Thai career
Khaosai was born as Sura Saenkham in Phetchabun Province, Northern Thailand. He was a Muay Thai fighter in the early 1980s, and took the professional name Galaxy from a restaurant and nightclub owned by his manager's friend. Khaosai had tremendous punching power, particularly in his soon-to-be legendary left hand. On the advice of his manager and trainer, he switched to Marquis of Queensbury style and began training as a western style boxer.

In Muay Thai his ring names are Daoden Muangsithep and Khaosai Wangchomphu.

He praised his mother as the first trainer, because she was fond of boxing and Muay Thai. Due to he and his twin brother Khaokor Galaxy were born during the time that Pone Kingpetch, the first Thai world champion, was becoming famous.

His mother would wake them up at 4.00 a.m. for a run before school, along with supporting everything for the twins to fight.

Boxing style
Lacking the amateur boxing experience common to most Western professional boxers, Khaosai's skills originally were limited, and he relied on toughness and his fearsome punching power to win. His southpaw style was based on closing his opponent and firing his left hand whenever he saw an opening. His right hand was used mainly to judge the distance for his left. All of his knockouts came by his left, which is arguably the hardest single punch in the history of the lower weight classes.

As he gained experience, Khaosai began to develop into a more refined boxer, learning combination punching to complement his deadly left. His favorite punch, a straight left to the midsection, translates roughly as "the left hand that drills intestines."
Incredibly strong, he was never out-muscled, while opponents who tried the traditional stick-and-move techniques found he had quick feet and was able to block their movements.

Professional boxing career
Khaosai began his international style boxing career in December 1980. He won all of his first six fights, which earned him a shot at the Thailand bantamweight (118-pound) title on 1981 against Sakda Saksuree. He lost on a points decision. It was to be the last fight he would ever lose in the ring.

Khaosai won his next three fights and claimed the Thai bantamweight title in 1982. He won 15 consecutive fights by knockout and climbed in the world rankings to become super-flyweight WBA world champion Jiro Watanabe's mandatory challenger by the summer of 1984.

When Watanabe failed to defend his title against Khaosai, the WBA stripped him and matched Khaosai against undefeated Eusebio Espinal for the vacant championship on 1984. Khaosai knocked out Espinal in the sixth round, beginning the longest title reign in his division's history.

Khaosai defended his WBA title 19 times over the next seven years, winning 16 of his title fights by knockouts. In the mid-1980s, when world heavyweight champion Mike Tyson was in his prime and scoring knockouts over everyone, boxing fans nicknamed Khaosai The Thai Tyson for knockout wins.

Khaosai fought only once outside of Asia, when he defended his title in 1986 against unbeaten (and future WBA bantamweight titleholder) Israel Contreras in Curaçao. He had two title fights in Kōbe, Japan, one in South Korea and one at Bung Karno Stadium, Indonesia. The rest were in Thailand, where he often fought for purses in excess of $100,000 in front of huge crowds. That, plus the fact that few top fighters anywhere were willing to challenge Khaosai, made him relatively unknown in the West.

In 1988, his twin younger brother, fighting under the name Kaokhor Galaxy, captured the WBA bantamweight title, making the Galaxy brothers (Saenkham brothers) the first twins to ever be world boxing champions.

Retirement
He fought for the last time on December 22, 1991 in Bangkok, beating Armando Castro over 12 rounds. A few weeks later, he announced his retirement with a record of 47 wins against only one defeat, and never attempted a comeback.

Life after boxing
Not long after his retirement to the boxing profession, Khaosai chose to take part in the Thai entertainment industry. He first took a shot at the music industry, releasing a single, "Khob Khun Krub", meaning "Thank You", then began taking part in TV series and movies, particularly comedies. His first role as an actor occurred during the TV series Poot Mae Nam Khong (1992 version), which was then followed by Mon Rak Luk Thung (1995 version), The Legend of Suriyothai (2001), and The Bodyguard (2004) etc. In 2005, while he was taking part in a film, he was punched in the face by a drunken fan, who wished to obtain Khaosai's shirt for collection but was denied.  The incident made frontline news, which displayed a photo of Khaosai, with a bandage on his face but smiling and standing next to the drunk man.

In 2006, he starred in a music video for a song by fellow boxers Somluck Kamsing and Samart Payakaroon. In the video, Khaosai portrayed a shy man being approached by a young woman.

After retirement, he married the Japanese Yumiko Ota, whom he had met during a trip for his second fight with Kenji Matsumura in Kōbe, Japan in 1989. The couple lived together for only one year, and later divorced.

He later married a Buriram woman, Sureerat "Fah" Saenkham (née Niwesram). They had no children together, but Khaosai chose to take his wife's nephew as a stepchild.

In March 2013, he made news again when he unexpectedly was married again, this time to Wannapa "Nung" Kamboonsri, before obtaining a legal divorce from his previous wife. The same year, he became a father for the first time at the age of 54, when his wife safely delivered a daughter. In 2016, his wife delivered a second daughter by the end of the year.

Currently, he owns two  Muay Thai gyms in Bangkok  and Phuket, and was a trainer for Denkaosan Kaovichit in the fight against Takefumi Sakata which took place by the end of 2008 in Yokohama, Japan. (Denkaosan knocked his opponent out by the second round, becoming the next WBA flyweight champion).

Besides boxing and entertainment, Khaosai has also flirted with politics. During the 2007 Thai general election, he was a candidate in the party-list of the Puea Pandin Party, but lost. Additionally, during the 2011 Thai general election, he became a candidate on behalf of the Chartthaipattana Party for his native Phetchabun 2nd district, but lost with only 8,485 votes.

Legacy
He was selected to the International Boxing Hall of Fame in 1999 and remains a well known boxer throughout Thailand.

Every time he fought, there was a saying that traffic in Bangkok was good, because everyone rushed home to see him on TV.

Professional boxing record

References

External links

Khosai Galaxy Muay Thai Gym official

1959 births
Living people
Khaosai Galaxy
Super-flyweight boxers
World boxing champions
World super-flyweight boxing champions
World Boxing Association champions
International Boxing Hall of Fame inductees
Khaosai Galaxy
Khaosai Galaxy
Khaosai Galaxy
Khaosai Galaxy
Muay Thai trainers
Boxing trainers
Southpaw boxers